

Notes

References
Footnotes

Sources

Record Retailer